Kumrakhali is a village in Barguna District in the Barisal Division of southern-central Bangladesh.

References

External links
Satellite map at Maplandia.com

Villages in Barisal Division
Populated places in Barguna District
Villages in Barguna District